Trojan Source is the name of a software vulnerability that abuses Unicode's bidirectional characters to display source code differently than the actual execution of the source code. The exploit utilizes how writing scripts of different reading directions are displayed and encoded on computers. It was discovered by Nicholas Boucher and Ross Anderson at Cambridge University in late 2021.

Background 

Unicode is an encoding standard for representing text, symbols, and glyphs. Unicode is the most dominant encoding on computers, used in over 97% of websites as of March 2022. It supports many languages, and because of this, it must support different methods of writing text. This requires support for both left-to-right languages such as English and Russian, and right-to-left languages such as Hebrew and Arabic. Since Unicode aims to solve using more than one writing system, it must be able to mix scripts with different display orders and resolve conflicting orders. To fix this, Unicode contains characters called bidirectional characters (Bidi) that describe how text is displayed and represented. These characters can be abused to change how text is interpreted without changing it visually, as the characters are often invisible.

Methodology 
In the exploit, bidirectional characters are abused to visually reorder text in source code so that later execution occurs in a different order.
Bidirectional characters can be inserted in areas of source code where string literals are allowed. This often applies to documentation, variables, or comments.

In the above example, the RLI mark (right-to-left isolate) forces the following text to be interpreted in the reverse order: the triple-quote is first (ending the string), followed by a semicolon (starting a new line), and finally with the premature return (returning  and ignoring any code below it). The new line terminates the RLI mark, preventing it from flowing into the below code. Because of the Bidi character, some source code editors and IDEs rearrange the code for display without any visual indication that the code has been rearranged, so a human code reviewer would not normally detect them. However, when the code is inserted into a compiler, the compiler may ignore the Bidi char and process the characters in a different order than visually displayed. When the compiler is finished, it could potentially execute code that visually appeared to be non-executable. Formatting marks can be combined multiple times to create complex attacks.

Impact and mitigation 
Programming languages that support Unicode strings and follow Unicode's Bidi algorithm are vulnerable to the exploit. This includes languages like Java, Go, C, C++, C#, Python, and JavaScript.

While the attack is not strictly an error, many compilers, interpreters, and websites added warnings or mitigations for the exploit. Both GNU GCC and LLVM received requests to deal with the exploit. Marek Polacek submitted a patch to GCC shortly after the exploit was published that implemented a warning for potentially unsafe directional characters; this functionality was merged for GCC 12 under the -Wbidi-chars flag. LLVM also merged similar patches.
Rust fixed the exploit in 1.56.1, rejecting code that includes the characters by default. The developers of Rust found no vulnerable packages prior to the fix.

Red Hat issued an advisory on their website, labeling the exploit as "moderate".
GitHub released a warning on their blog, as well as updating the website to show a dialog box when Bidi characters are detected in a repository's code.

References

External links 

 https://trojansource.codes/ site by the discoverers, Nicholas Boucher and Ross Anderson
 Proof of concept code 
 Trojan Source full research paper
 NIST National Vulnerability Database & CVE Common Vulnerabilities and Exposures
 CVE-2021-42574 - NIST & CVE (BIDI exploit)
 CVE-2021-42694 - NIST & CVE (homoglyph attack)
 UAX 9 from the Unicode Consortium about bidirectional characters and formatting
 Unicode UTR 36 from the Unicode Consortium, which describes the vulnerability in Unicode
 CERT/CC vulnerability report

2021 in computing
Injection exploits
Software bugs